The 1913 Tie Cup Final was the final match to decide the winner of the Tie Cup, the 13th. edition of the international competition organised by the Argentine and Uruguayan Associations together. The final was contested by Argentine side San Isidro and Uruguayan team Nacional,

In the match, played at Estadio Racing Club in Avellaneda, Nacional beat San Isidro 1–0, taking revenge on the previous edition and also winning its first Tie Cup tournament.

Qualified teams

Overview 

San Isidro earned its place in the final after having won the 1913 Copa de Competencia Jockey Club, where the squad beat Newell's Old Boys (4–2 in Rosario), Boca Juniors (2–1 in San Isidro), Banfield (4–1 also in San Isidro) and Racing in the final (2–0).

The match was held Estadio Racing Club on 29 October, 1913. The only goal was on 37 minutes, when goalkeeper Wilson stopped a shot by Gorla, the rebound came to José María Seoane which scored for the 1–0 that allowed Nacional to win their first Tie Cup trophy.

Match details

References

T
T
1913 in Argentine football
1913 in Uruguayan football
Football in Avellaneda